Confession inscriptions of Lydia and Phrygia are Roman-era Koine Greek religious steles from these historical regions of Anatolia (then part of Asia and Galatia  provinces), dating mostly to the second and third centuries.

The new element that appears, the public confession of sin and the redemption through offerings, unknown to traditional Greek religion, has made scholars to name this social phenomenon as oriental. The religious thought and the use of vernacular Koine Greek, full of innovative orthography, syntax and grammar, suggests that they may also represent something at the root of religion in Phrygia and Lydia. Marijana Ricl has argued that the practice of confession is a reminiscence of Hittite religion. According to Schnabel E.J it was a counter-move prompted by the increasing success of the Christian missionaries. Indeed, beside the scheme of confession and redemption, the phraseology and terms are reminiscent of Greek New Testament:  (sin),  (advocate),  (servant of God),  (master),  (king). Another point for discussion is the punishment of sexual transgressions, which further relates the inscriptions to Christianity and the concept of chastity in Hellenistic philosophy and religion, in contrast to the previous perception of sexuality inside the religion (Hieros gamos, Sacred prostitution, Aphrodite Pandemos).

Some indicating names or epithets of deities engaged in the inscriptions are: Men (Axiottenos, Artemidoros), Meter (mother), Zeus (Aithrios, Keraunios, Soter), Apollo, Hypsistos, Anaitis, Attis, Dionysos, Hades, Herakles, Sabazios, Batenos, Nemesis, Asclepius, Tyrannos, Basileus, Theos Strapton and Bronton, Hecate, and Artemis.

Inscriptions

Ritual dialogue of Theodoros with the Gods (Lydia, 235/236 AD) 

According to George Petzl, a trial of sacred theatre did take place in the sanctuary; Theodoros was convicted and jailed. Zeus was impersonated by a priest. According to Ender Varinlioglu,  (jail) is used metaphorically. Blindness was the jail or punishment upon Theodoros in order to be saved from his licentious sexual activities.

Soterchos of Motella (Phrygia, 3rd century AD)

References

Further reading
 Hughes, Jessica. “Punishing Bodies: The Lydian and Phrygian ‘Propitiatory’ Stelai, Second–Third Centuries AD”. In: Votive Body Parts in Greek and Roman Religion. Cambridge Classical Studies. Cambridge: Cambridge University Press, 2017. pp. 151–86. doi:10.1017/9781316662403.005.

External links
Divine Tyranny and Public Humiliation: A Suggestion for the Interpretation of the Lydian and Phrygian Confession Inscription Schnabel E.J
Under the watchful eyes of the gods: divine justice in Hellenistic and Roman Asia Minor by Angelos Chaniotis
Human Transgression – Divine Retribution A study of religious transgressions and punishments in Greek cultic regulations and Lydian-Phrygian reconciliation inscriptions by Aslak Rostad
The curse of the law and the crisis in Galatia : reassessing the purpose of Galatians by Todd A Wilson
Anatolia: Land, Men, and Gods in Asia Minor by Stephen Mitchell Volume I The Celts in Anatolia and the Impact of Roman Rule

2nd century in religion
3rd century in religion
2nd-century inscriptions
3rd-century inscriptions
Roman-era Greek inscriptions
Greek religion inscriptions
Lydia
Phrygian religion
Roman Anatolia
Christianity and Hellenistic religion
Anthropology of religion
Sexuality and religion